Pleumjit Thinkaow (born 9 November 1983) is a Thai volleyball player.

She was a member of the Thailand women's national volleyball team. Her international debut was at the 21st SEA Games in Malaysia.

Personal life
Pleumjit grew up in a sport-loving family in Angthong (a province about 100 km. north of Bangkok), having an elder brother.  Her parents are civil servants.  Before she started playing volleyball, she had been rather into table tennis. She switched to volleyball following her father's advice that volleyball was more fun and more likely to become popular.  Afterwards, a volleyball coach of Bodindecha (Sing Singhaseni) School in Bangkok was so impressed by her playing that he brought her to the school during her high-school level. At first, she did not play as a middle blocker but an outside hitter.
 
Pleumjit was first capped for the national junior team in 2000.  A year later, she was chosen to join the national team.  She went to play professional volleyball overseas for the first time in China for a month when she was 20 years old.
 
Pleumjit got her bachelor's degree and master's degree in Business Administration from Rattana Bundit University Bangkok.

Career
Thinkaow won the 2013–14 Azerbaijani Super League Bronze Medal 3–0 to Azerrail Baku and she won the Best Spiker award. She ranked fifth in the 2010 Club World Championship with Federbrau and also ranked fifth in the 2011 Club World Championship playing with Chang. In the 2016 Club World Championship she ranked seventh with Bangkok Glass.

For the 2017 season, she played on loan with the Thai club Supreme Chonburi.

In 2018 she played with the local Supreme Chonburi on loan.

She is on the list 2019 Korea-Thailand all star super match competition.

Pleumjit retired at the age of 37, after the 2021 FIVB Volleyball Women's Nations League.

Clubs
  Huanghe (2004)
  Aurum (2005–2006)
  Bangkok (2006)
  Vital Thai Binh (2006–2007)
  Ereğli Belediye (2007–2010)
  Federbrau (2010–2011)
  Fujian Xi Meng Bao (2010–2012)
  Chang (2011–2012)
  Supreme Nakhonsi (2011–2013)
  Igtisadchi Baku (2012–2014)
  Supreme Chonburi (2013–2014)
  Bangkok Glass (2014–2018)
  Supreme Chonburi (2018–Present)

Awards

Individuals
 2006 Thailand League – "Best Middle Blocker"
 2007 Asian Championship – "Best Blocker"
 2007 Asian Club Championship – "Best Server"
 2013 FIVB World Grand Champions Cup – "Best Middle Blocker"
 2013–14 Azerbaijan Super League – "Best Spiker"
 2014–15 Thailand League – "Best Middle Blocker"
 2015 Thai-Denmark Super League – "Most Valuable Player"
 2015 Asian Championship – "Best Middle Blocker"
 2015 Asian Club Championship – "Most Valuable Player"
 2015–16 Thailand League – "Best Middle Blocker"
 2015–16 Thailand League – "Most Valuable Player"
 2016 Asian Club Championship – "Best Middle Blocker"
 2017 VTV Binh Dien International Cup – "Best Middle Blocker"
 2017 Asian Club Championship – "Best Middle Blocker"
 2016–17 Thailand League – "Best Middle Blocker"
 2017–18 Thailand League – "Best Middle Blocker"
 2018–19 Thailand League – "Best Middle Blocker"
 2020 Thailand League – "Best Middle Blocker"

Clubs
 2010–11 Chinese League D.2 –  Champion, with Fujian Xi Meng Bao
 2011–12 Thailand League –  Runner-up, with Supreme Nakhonsi
 2012–13 Azerbaijan Super League –  Runner-up, with Igtisadchi Baku
 2014–2015 Thailand League –  Champion, with Bangkok Glass
 2015 Thai-Denmark Super League –  Champion, with Bangkok Glass
 2015–16 Thailand League –  Champion, with Bangkok Glass
 2016 Thai–Denmark Super League –  Champion, with Bangkok Glass
 2016–17 Thailand League –  Runner-up, with Bangkok Glass
 2018–19 Thailand League –  Runner-up, with Supreme Chonburi
 2019 Thai–Denmark Super League –  Champion, with Supreme Chonburi
 2020 Thailand League –  Champion, with Supreme Chonburi
 2007 Asian Club Championship –  Runner-up, with Sang Som
 2008 Asian Club Championship –  Runner-up, with Sang Som
 2009 Asian Club Championship –  Champion, with Federbrau
 2010 Asian Club Championship –  Champion, with Federbrau
 2011 Asian Club Championship –  Champion, with Chang
 2012 Asian Club Championship –  Bronze medal, with Chang
 2015 Asian Club Championship –  Champion, with Bangkok Glass
 2016 Asian Club Championship –  Bronze medal, with Bangkok Glass
 2017 Asian Club Championship –  Champion, with Supreme Chonburi
 2018 Asian Club Championship –  Champion, with Supreme Chonburi
 2019 Asian Club Championship –  Runner-up, with Supreme Chonburi

MC 
 Teevision 
 20 : ทุกวัน เวลา น.-น. ทางช่อง ร่วมกับ

 Online 
 20 : วิลาพาทัวร์ Ep2 ทางช่อง YouTube:PJ STORY
 2021 : ทางช่อง YouTube:pleumwila

Royal decorations 
 2013 -  Commander (Third Class) of The Most Exalted Order of the White Elephant
 2010 -  Commander (Third Class) of The Most Admirable Order of the Direkgunabhorn
 2005 -  Member (Fifth Class) of The Most Admirable Order of the Direkgunabhorn

References

External links

1983 births
Pleumjit Thinkaow
Pleumjit Thinkaow
Living people
Asian Games medalists in volleyball
Volleyball players at the 2002 Asian Games
Volleyball players at the 2006 Asian Games
Volleyball players at the 2010 Asian Games
Volleyball players at the 2014 Asian Games
Volleyball players at the 2018 Asian Games
Igtisadchi Baku volleyball players
Thai expatriate sportspeople in Azerbaijan
Pleumjit Thinkaow
Pleumjit Thinkaow
Pleumjit Thinkaow
Medalists at the 2014 Asian Games
Medalists at the 2018 Asian Games
Pleumjit Thinkaow
Southeast Asian Games medalists in volleyball
Universiade medalists in volleyball
Pleumjit Thinkaow
Competitors at the 2001 Southeast Asian Games
Competitors at the 2003 Southeast Asian Games
Competitors at the 2005 Southeast Asian Games
Competitors at the 2007 Southeast Asian Games
Competitors at the 2009 Southeast Asian Games
Competitors at the 2011 Southeast Asian Games
Competitors at the 2013 Southeast Asian Games
Competitors at the 2015 Southeast Asian Games
Competitors at the 2017 Southeast Asian Games
Universiade bronze medalists for Thailand
Competitors at the 2019 Southeast Asian Games
Middle blockers
Pleumjit Thinkaow
Thai expatriate sportspeople in China
Expatriate volleyball players in Russia
Thai expatriate sportspeople in Russia
Thai expatriate sportspeople in Vietnam
Thai expatriate sportspeople in Turkey
Expatriate volleyball players in Turkey
Expatriate volleyball players in Azerbaijan
Expatriate volleyball players in China
Expatriate volleyball players in Vietnam